In geometry, the order-8 square tiling is a regular tiling of the hyperbolic plane. It has Schläfli symbol of {4,8}.

Symmetry 
This tiling represents a hyperbolic kaleidoscope of 4 mirrors meeting as edges of a square, with eight squares around every vertex. This symmetry by orbifold notation is called (*4444) with 4 order-4 mirror intersections. In Coxeter notation can be represented as [1+,8,8,1+], (*4444 orbifold) removing two of three mirrors (passing through the square center) in the [8,8] symmetry. The *4444 symmetry can be doubled by bisecting the fundamental domain (square) by a mirror, creating *884 symmetry. 

This bicolored square tiling shows the even/odd reflective fundamental square domains of this symmetry. This bicolored tiling has a wythoff construction (4,4,4), or {4[3]}, :

Related polyhedra and tiling 

This tiling is topologically related as a part of sequence of regular polyhedra and tilings with vertex figure (4n).

See also

Square tiling
Uniform tilings in hyperbolic plane
List of regular polytopes

References

 John H. Conway, Heidi Burgiel, Chaim Goodman-Strass, The Symmetries of Things 2008,  (Chapter 19, The Hyperbolic Archimedean Tessellations)

External links 

 Hyperbolic and Spherical Tiling Gallery
 KaleidoTile 3: Educational software to create spherical, planar and hyperbolic tilings
 Hyperbolic Planar Tessellations, Don Hatch

Hyperbolic tilings
Isogonal tilings
Isohedral tilings
Order-8 tilings
Regular tilings
Square tilings